Alive on Planet Earth is the first live album by the progressive rock band The Flower Kings. It was released in double-CD format in 2000.

Track listing
All songs by Roine Stolt except where noted.

Disc One
 "There Is More to This World" – 11:31
 "Church of Your Heart" – 9:41
 "The Judas Kiss" – 15:43
 "Nothing New Under the Sun" – 4:13
 "The Lamb Lies Down on Broadway" (Genesis cover) (Tony Banks, Phil Collins, Peter Gabriel, Steve Hackett, Mike Rutherford) – 9:17

Disc Two
 "Big Puzzle" – 18:28
 "The Sounds Of Violence" – 6:38
 "Three Stories" (Tomas Bodin) – 6:05
 "In The Eyes Of The World" – 12:07
 "The Flower King" – 11:26
 "Stardust We Are, Pt. 3" – 9:45

Disc one was recorded at ProgDay in Chapel Hill, North Carolina, USA, on 6 September 1998, and at D'Auteuil in Quebec City, Canada, on 11–12 September 1998, with Robert Engstrand on keyboards.
Disc two was recorded at On Air West in Tokyo, Japan, on 15–16 March 1999, and Club Quatro, Osaka, Japan, on 18 March 1999, with Tomas Bodin on keyboards.

Personnel
 Tomas Bodin – keyboards
 Robert Engstrand – keyboards
 Hasse Fröberg – acoustic guitar, electric guitar, slide guitar, vocals
 Jaime Salazar – drums, snare drums, percussion, vocals
 Michael Stolt – bass guitar, synthesizer bass, vocals
 Roine Stolt – guitar, photography, vocals

Production
 Don Bridges – photography
 Florent Cuaz – photography
 Stephen Geysens – engineer
 Noriya Maekawa – engineer
 David Palermo – artwork
 Atsushi Sofuni – photography

References

The Flower Kings albums
2000 live albums
Century Media Records live albums